Hautemorges is a municipality in the Swiss canton of Vaud, located in the district of Morges.

On 1 July 2021 the former municipalities of Apples, Cottens, Pampigny, Sévery, Bussy-Chardonney and Reverolle merged into the new municipality of Hautemorges.

History

Apples
Apples has a long history of settlements. Remains from the Neolithic, the Bronze Age, and the Romans have been found in the municipality.  The first true settlement was founded by the Burgundians in the 5th century. It was most likely called Iplingen.  Under the Romans this name probably was changed to Iplens and then Aplis. It was with this name that the village was first mentioned in a document, in 1011, when King Rudolf III presented the church and the village to the Romainmôtier Monastery as a gift. The spelling Aples appeared later (in 1222) and the current name came into use in 1328.

With the capture of Vaud by Bern in 1536, Apples became an exclave under the administration of the Romainmôtier district. After the collapse of the Ancien régime, the village became a part of the canton of Léman, from 1798 to 1803. It was subsequently absorbed by the canton of Vaud, and in 1798 it became a part of the Morges District.

Cottens
Cottens is first mentioned in 1041 as Chotens.

Pampigny

Pampigny is first mentioned in 1141 as Pampiniaco.

Sévery
Sévery is first mentioned in 979 as Siuiriaco.  In 1453 it was mentioned as Syuiriez.

Bussy-Chardonney
The municipality was created in 1961 by a merger of Bussy-sur-Morges and Chardonney-sur-Morges. Bussy is first mentioned about 1059 as Bussi.  Chardonney-sur-Morges was first mentioned in 1324 as Chardonne.

Reverolle
Reverolle is first mentioned in 1177 as Ruuilora.

Geography

Demographics

Historic Population
The historical population is given in the following chart:

Sights
The entire village of Pampigny is designated as part of the Inventory of Swiss Heritage Sites.

References

External links

Municipalities of the canton of Vaud